UGC 477 is a low surface brightness (LSB) galaxy, located in the Pisces constellation. It is located over 110 million light years away. At around 100,000 light years across, it is similar in size to Milky Way galaxy.

References 

Low surface brightness galaxies
Pisces (constellation)
00477
+03-03-002
02699